Spelaeodiscidae is a family of very small air-breathing land snails, terrestrial pulmonate gastropod mollusks in the superfamily Pupilloidea (according to the taxonomy of the Gastropoda by Bouchet & Rocroi, 2005).

The family Spelaeodiscidae has no subfamilies (according to the taxonomy of the Gastropoda by Bouchet & Rocroi, 2005).

Genera 
Genera within the family Spelaeodiscidae include:
 Klemmia Gittenberger, 1969
 Spelaeodiscus Brusina, 1886 - type genus of the family Spelaeodiscidae
 Virpazaria Gittenberger, 1969

References